The Party of Labour of Burkina was a political party in Burkina Faso (formerly Upper Volta).

The PTB was a Marxist-Leninist party founded in 1990 as a split from the Organization for Popular Democracy - Labour Movement (ODP-MT) mainly by former members of the Union of Burkinabè Communists. It merged with the Party for Democracy and Progress in February 1996.

The secretary general  of the PTB Oumarou Clément Ouédraogo was killed in 1991.

Communist parties in Burkina Faso
Labour parties
Political parties established in 1990
Defunct political parties in Burkina Faso